Juan Carlos Ferrero Donat (born 12 February 1980) is a Spanish former world No. 1 tennis player. He won the men's singles title at the 2003 French Open, and in September of that year became the 21st player to hold the top ranking, which he held for eight weeks. He was runner-up at the 2002 French Open and 2003 US Open and won 16 ATP titles, including 4 Masters 1000 events. He was nicknamed "Mosquito" for his speed and slender physical build. Ferrero retired from professional tennis following the 2012 Valencia Open.

Personal life
Nicknamed Juanki and "El Mosquito", Ferrero began playing tennis at age seven with his father, Eduardo Ferrero Micó (1943—2022), who often traveled with him. He has two sisters, Ana and Laura and admires the play of former No. 1 Jim Courier. Ferrero's inspiration has been his mother, Rosario, who died of cancer in 1996, when he was 16. In July 2007, he bought an old cottage in Bocairent, south of Valencia, and refurbished it into "Hotel Ferrero", which features 12 luxury suites. He used to be a joint owner of the Valencia Open tournament together with fellow tennis player David Ferrer. His fitness trainer was Miguel Maeso, and he was coached by Antonio Martínez Cascales (from 1989) and Salvador Navarro (from May 2008). He and his wife had their first child, a daughter, in September 2014. The couple married in July 2015. They have had two more children since.

Playing style and equipment
Although Ferrero was known as one of the best clay-court players during his prime, he distinguished himself as an all-court and all-round player through his solid performance on hard- and grass-court tournaments. He said during an interview that he preferred playing on hard courts. Tennis experts agreed that Ferrero's clay-court game translated well to the hard court due to his aggressive style of playing. He also had one of the greatest forehands in the game and immense speed on the court. He was sponsored by Nike, Sergio Tacchini, and Lotto Sport Italia for his apparel on court. In 2010, he signed an endorsement deal with Joma He uses Lacoste (since 2012) for his clothes, Asics for shoes and Prince Sports for his racquets. He played with a Prince EXO3 Tour 100 Mid+ (16x18) racquet.

Career

Early years
Born in Ontinyent, Ferrero came to prominence in 1998, making the final of the French Open Juniors, losing to Fernando González. He finished the year ranked as the No. 17 junior. He then made his professional debut in 1998 by reaching the finals of his first Futures tournament in Italy. He won two Futures events in Spain, and ended the year ranked No. 345.

1999
He made his first ATP main draw debut at the Grand Prix Hassan II as a qualifier, where he reached the semi-finals. He followed it up by winning a Challenger events in Naples. He then received a wildcard at the Open Seat Godó and reached the third round losing to Carlos Moyá. He reached back–to–back finals, marking his top 100 debut at no. 95. He then reached his fourth challenger final of the year at Graz losing Tomáš Zíb. He then played at the Generali Open, where he earned his first top 20 win in the second round against No. 15 Tommy Haas, before losing in the quarterfinals. He made his Grand Slam debut at the US Open in August, losing to ninth seeded Greg Rusedski in the first round. The following month, in just his fifth professional event, he won his first career title at the Majorca Open, which propelled him from No. 68 to 47. He ended the year at No. 43 and won the ATP Newcomer of the Year award.

2000
He began the year at the Heineken Open and made the quarterfinals. He made his Australian Open debut, making it to the third round, where he was defeated by Younes El Aynaoui in a tight five–setter, 6–7(3–7), 6–4, 6–4, 6–7(5–7), 4–6. Shortly after, he reached the finals at the Dubai Tennis Championships, losing to Nicolas Kiefer, en route earning his first top 10 win over then No. 9 Nicolás Lapentti in the second round. He backed it up with a semifinal showing at the Franklin Templeton Tennis Classic, falling to Australian Lleyton Hewitt. At the first Masters of the year, he lost his first matches at the Indian Wells Masters to Michael Chang 5–7, 4–6 and at the Ericsson Open to George Bastl. He then represented Davis Cup for the first time, winning both his matches.

At the European clay season, Ferrero made it to back–to–back quarterfinals at the Estoril Open and his first masters quarterfinals at the Monte Carlo Open, losing to Nicolás Lapentti and Gastón Gaudio respectively. He made it to his second final of the year at the Torneo Godó losing to Marat Safin. By doing so, Ferrero entered the top 20 for the first time at No. 18. At the final Masters series of the clay court swing, Ferrero didn't fare well, losing to lower ranked opponent. He made the third round of the Italian Open losing to Mariano Puerta and second round of the German Open losing to Andrei Pavel. However, he bounced back by reaching the semifinals of his first French Open after defeating No. 10 Àlex Corretja before losing to the eventual champion Gustavo Kuerten in five sets. He then chose not to compete at Wimbledon.

At the US Open, he reached the fourth round but lost convincingly to eventual champion Marat Safin. He then represented Spain at the Summer Olympics in Sydney, he reached the quarterfinals losing to France's Arnaud di Pasquale. He then suffered loses in his first match in his next four events, at the CA–TennisTrophy to Richard Krajicek 4–6, 4–6, the adidas Open de Toulouse to Magnus Gustafsson 2–6, 6–7(9–11), the Davidoff Swiss Indoors to Richard Krajicek 4–6, 3–6, and the Stuttgart Masters to Younes El Aynaoui 6–7(4–7), 4–6. The drought ended when he reached the semifinals of Paris Masters, losing to eventual champion Marat Safin, 2–6, 2–6. However, he lost at the first round of the Scania Stockholm Open to Adrian Voinea 7–6(7–5), 2–6, 3–6. He then led Spain win the Davis Cup against Australia with a 3–1 win, when Ferrero won both his matches against Patrick Rafter 6–7(4), 7–6(2), 6–2, 3–1 RET and Lleyton Hewitt 6–2, 7–6(7–5), 4–6, 6–4, handing Spain their first Davis Cup title. Although he did not win any titles in 2000, his significant performances in major tournaments helped him end the year ranked No. 12.

2001
Ferrero started the year poorly, suffering three consecutive loses, beginning with a second round loss at the Australian Open to Australian Andrew Ilie 6–3, 2–6, 1–6, 6–1, 2–6, followed by loses at Davis Cup to Dutch Raemon Sluiter 7–6(7–5), 6–7(7–9), 6–3, 6–7(3–7), 4–6 and the first round at the ABN AMRO World Tennis Tournament to Ivan Ljubičić 6–7(2–7), 4–6. He bounced back at the Dubai Tennis Championships defeating Marat Safin, 6–2, 3–1 RET in the final, after upsetting No. 5 Magnus Norman 6–2, 4–6, 6–4 in the quarterfinals. He suffered a first round loss at the Indian Wells Masters in three tie–break sets to Nicolás Massú and a fourth round loss to Gastón Gaudio 0–6, 6–3, 3–6 at the Ericsson Open.

He began the European clay season by winning the Estoril Open in an all–Spanish final, defeating Félix Mantilla, 7–6, 4–6, 6–3. This placed him at No. 9 in the world, his top 10 debut. Despite suffering an early exit at the second round of the Monte Carlo Masters to Galo Blanco 2–6, 6–7(3–7), he recovered by making it to three consecutive finals. Winning his first two at the Open SEAT Godó defeating Carlos Moyá, 4–6, 7–5, 6–3, 3–6, 7–5 and his first Masters title at the Rome Masters defeating Gustavo Kuerten, 3–6, 6–1, 2–6, 6–4, 6–2, his first win over a No. 1-ranked opponent. He lost the third final at the Hamburg Masters losing to Albert Portas, 6–4, 2–6, 6–0, 6–7, 5–7(5–7). He then followed his success by reaching the semifinals after defeating Lleyton Hewitt 6–4, 6–2, 6–1 at the French Open for the second consecutive year, losing again to the No. 1 seed, defending champion, and eventual champion Gustavo Kuerten 4–6, 4–6, 3–6. In his first Wimbledon, he was able to reach the third round losing to Britain's Greg Rusedski 1–6, 4–6, 4–6.

Ferrero also reached the finals at the UBS Open, losing to Jiří Novák, 1–6, 7–6(7–5), 5–7. He followed it up with a quarterfinal showing at the Generali Open falling to Nicolás Lapentti 6–7(6–8), 2–6 and at the Canada Masters falling to Patrick Rafter 5–7, 6–4, 2–6. He then had a disappointing results in America, losing in the second round of the Cincinnati Masters to Hicham Arazi 7–6(7–1), 4–6, 4–6 and the third round of the US Open with his compatriot Tommy Robredo upsetting him in a tight five setter 6–7(5–7), 6–4, 4–6, 6–4, 6–7(1–7). He then helped his Davis Cup team get back to the world group by defeating Uzbekistan's Oleg Ogorodov 7–5, 6–2, 6–4. He then made the quarterfinals of the Salem Open losing to Rainer Schüttler 3–6, 6–7(6–8) and the Grand Prix de Tennis de Lyon to Younes El Aynaoui 4–6, 4–6. However, he fell in his first matches at the Stuttgart Masters to Thomas Enqvist 6–4, 3–6, 6–7(4–7) and at the St. Petersburg Open to Rainer Schüttler 6–7(8–10), 4–6. At the final Masters event of the year the Paris Masters, he fell in the third round to Hicham Arazi 2–6, 6–4, 3–6. Ferrero qualified for the Tennis Masters Cup and advance to the semifinals defeating Gustavo Kuerten 7–6(7–3), 6–2 and Goran Ivanišević 7–6(7–4), 7–6(7–5), but losing to Yevgeny Kafelnikov 6–4, 1–6, 6–7(5–7) in the round robin stage. In the semifinals, he lost to eventual champion Lleyton Hewitt, 4–6, 3–6. He finished the year ranked No. 5.

2002
In 2002, Ferrero missed the Australian Open due to bursitis in his right knee. He started his year at the Milan Indoor, but was upset by eventual champion Davide Sanguinetti 6–3, 6–7(0–7), 4–6 in the second round. He then represented Spain in the first round Davis Cup tie against Morocco, he went to win one against Hicham Arazi 6–3, 6–1, 6–2 and lost one to Younes El Aynaoui 6–7(2–7), 0–6, 6–3, 6–0, 3–6. He made his first quarterfinal of the year at the Open 13, but was upset by No. 99 Cédric Pioline 7–6(3–7), 4–6, 5–7. At the ABN AMRO World Tennis Tournament, he lost in his opening match against eventual champion Nicolas Escudé 7–5, 1–6, 0–6. As the defending champion at the Dubai Tennis Championships, he retired in his second-round match 1–2 down against Younes El Aynaoui with a pulled abductor. His form continued to dip with a couple of early exits: In the first round of the Pacific Life Open to Greg Rusedski, 4–6, 3–6, in the third round of the NASDAQ–100 Open to Adrian Voinea 6–7(6–8), 6–1, 2–6, and in the second round of the Estoril Open to David Nalbandian, 6–4, 4–6, 6–7(7–4).

He bounced back at the Monte Carlo Masters to reach the finals, where he earned his first top-10 wins of the year against Tommy Haas and Sébastien Grosjean, and he defeated Carlos Moyá in straight sets, 7–5, 6–3, 6–4, in the final to win the title. However, he was unable to keep his form, losing to Alberto Martín at the third round at Torneo Godó, losing to Ivan Ljubičić in the second round of Rome Masters, and the first round of the Hamburg Masters to Alberto Costa. These results made him fall out of the top 10 for the first time in a year. At the 2002 French Open, Ferrero reached his first Grand Slam final after upsetting No. 4 Andre Agassi 6–3, 5–7, 7–5, 6–3 and No. 2 Marat Safin 6–3, 6–2, 6–4. Despite being the strong favourite, he lost to compatriot Albert Costa, 1–6, 0–6, 6–4, 3–6. His foot was injured during the tournament, and he played through, taking some cortisone shots.

He fell early at the Wimbledon Championships to 98th-ranked American Jeff Morrison 3–6, 5–7, 6–7(5–7). He reached the finals at the Generali Open, losing to Àlex Corretja, 4–6, 1–6, 3–6. He made it to the semifinals in the Cincinnati Masters, losing to eventual champion Carlos Moyá, 3–6, 4–6. At the US Open he fell in the third round to Fernando González 4–6, 4–6, 4–6. He won his second title of the year in Hong Kong, avenging his loss to Carlos Moyá by beating him in the final, 6–3, 1–6, 7–6(7–4). He lost in the quarterfinal of the Madrid Masters to Andre Agassi 3–6, 2–6 and the semifinal of the Davidoff Swiss Indoors to Fernando González 4–6, 6–4, 1–6. He qualified to the Tennis Masters Cup; he advanced to the semifinals with wins over Andre Agassi 2–6, 7–6(8–6) and Jiří Novák 7–5, 6–3, but lost to Roger Federer 3–6, 4–6 in the round robin stage. He then advanced to the final by defeating compatriot Carlos Moyá, 6–7(6–8), 6–4, 6–4, but lost to No. 1 Lleyton Hewitt, 5–7, 5–7, 6–2, 6–2, 4–6. This result saw the Spaniard finish the year ranked No. 4.

2003
In 2003, Ferrero started the year by reaching the finals in the Adidas International, losing to Hyung-Taik Lee, 6–4, 6–7(6–8), 6–7(4–7). He went on to reach the quarter–finals of the Australian Open, losing to Wayne Ferreira, 6–7(4–7), 6–7(5–7), 1–6. He then competed for Spain at Davis Cup against Belgium and won both his matches against Christophe Rochus 6–3, 6–2, 7–5 and Kristof Vliegen 6–1, 6–4. He then competed at the ABN AMRO World Tennis Tournament but retired with a sprained ankle in the quarterfinals against Raemon Sluiter while leading 2–1 in the first set. At the next two Masters events of Pacific Life Open and NASDAQ–100 Open, he lost in the round of 32 to Brian Vahaly 4–6, 6–3, 3–6 and to Marcelo Ríos 3–6, 6–7(2–7). In the quarterfinals of Davis Cup against Croatia, he won his only match against Mario Ančić 6–4, 6–2, 7–6(7–1).

He won his first title of the year at the Monte Carlo Masters, which he defended by defeating Guillermo Coria, 6–2, 6–2. In his next four tournaments, he reached the semi–finals in Torneo Godó, losing to Marat Safin, 4–6, 3–6, and the semifinals at the 2003 Rome Masters retiring against Roger Federer, 4–6, 2–4 with a shoulder injury. He also won the Valencia Open, defeating Christophe Rochus, 6–2, 6–4, without losing a set. He then won his first and only Grand Slam at the 2003 French Open, defeating surprise finalist Martin Verkerk, 6–1, 6–3, 6–2, in the final. He reached the 4th round of Wimbledon losing to Sébastien Grosjean 2–6, 6–4, 6–7(2–7), 6–7(3–7). He reached back–to–back quarterfinals at the Generali Open losing to Mariano Zabaleta 1–6, 4–6 and at the Idea Prokom Open losing to Luis Horna 1–6, 6–7(1–7).

He fell early at the third round of the Canada Masters to Karol Kučera 3–6, 5–7 and at the second round of the Western & Southern Financial Group Masters to Gastón Gaudio 7–6(7–3), 6–7(5–7), 4–6. At the 2003 US Open his good form at the Grand Slams continued, eliminating former world No. 1s and former US Open champions Lleyton Hewitt 4–6, 6–3, 7–6(7–5), 6–1 and Andre Agassi 6–4, 6–3, 3–6, 6–4, before losing to Andy Roddick, 3–6, 6–7(2–7), 3–6, in the final. This result saw Ferrero take the No. 1 ranking from Agassi. He once again represented Davis Cup this time against Argentina, defeating Gastón Gaudio 6–4, 6–0, 6–0 but losing to Agustín Calleri 4–6, 5–7, 1–6. The year continued in Bangkok where he played for the first time as No. 1, losing to Taylor Dent in the final, 3–6, 6–7. He took his next title at the Madrid Masters, his first hard–court Masters title, by defeating Nicolás Massú, 6–3, 6–4, 6–3, in the final. He was presented with the Spanish "National Sportsman of the Year" award from King Juan Carlos. However, he went into a 6 match losing streak, In the third round of the BNP Paribas Masters to Jiří Novák 5–7, 5–7. At the Tennis Masters Cup, he lost all his three matches against David Nalbandian, Andre Agassi, and Roger Federer. Representing Spain in the Davis Cup final against Australia, he lost both his matches in 5 sets against Lleyton Hewitt 6–3, 3–6, 6–3, 6–7(0–7), 2–6 and Mark Philippoussis 5–7, 3–6, 6–1, 6–2, 0–6. Ferrero ended the year ranked No. 3, behind Andy Roddick and Roger Federer.

2004

Injuries began to plague Ferrero throughout 2004, and his ranking and form dipped. Despite making the Australian Open semifinals early in the year, losing to Roger Federer 4–6, 1–6, 4–6, and the finals of ABN AMRO World Tennis Tournament, losing to Lleyton Hewitt, 7–6, 5–7, 4–6, chicken pox kept him out for the entire month of March. He came back at Davis Cup against Netherlands and won both his matches defeating Raemon Sluiter 6–2, 6–2, 6–4 and Martin Verkerk 6–4, 6–7(5–7), 4–6, 7–5, 6–1 and the semifinals of the Open de Tenis Comunidad Valenciana losing to Fernando Verdasco 2–6, 1–6. After a first–round loss in Monte Carlo Masters to Alex Corretja 2–6, 3–6 in April, he required another month out for rest and recuperation. On 8 May, Ferrero fell during a practice session, injuring his ribs and his right wrist and went into the defence of his French Open crown under–prepared. He lost in the second round to Igor Andreev 4–6, 2–6, 3–6. At the Wimbledon Championships he reached the third round losing to Robby Ginepri 3–6, 4–6, 1–6. After Wimbledon, he failed to win back–to–back matches. He lost in the first rounds of Allianz Suisse Open Gstaad to Stefan Koubek 6–7(4–7), 4–6 and of Canada Masters retiring 2–3 down against Fabrice Santoro. He lost in the second round of Cincinnati Masters losing to Tommy Robredo 6–7(5–7), 6–4, 4–6, Summer Olympics losing to Mardy Fish 6–4, 6–7(5–7), 4–6, US Open to Stefan Koubek 6–7(2–7), 6–4, 7–6(8–6), 2–6, 3–6, China Open to Kevin Kim 4–6, 4–6, Grand Prix de Tennis de Lyon to David Ferrer 6–3, 5–7, 3–6, and Madrid Masters to Luis Horna 3–6, 1–6. He ended the year at 31, finishing outside the world's top 30 for the first time in five years.

2005
In 2005, Ferrero looked to return to the top of the game. However, he began his year with a loss to Jan Hernych 7–6(7–1), 1–6, 3–6 at the Heineken Open. At the Australian Open due to being seeded 31st, he met 6th ranked Guillermo Coria and lost 3–6, 2–6, 1–6. With this loss his ranking went down to 64 for the first time since September 1999. His ranking continued to drop to as low as 98, with first round loss at the Open 13 to eventual champion Joachim Johansson 6–7(4–7), 3–6, and second round loses at the ABN AMRO World Tennis Tournament to Radek Štěpánek 4–6, 7–6(8–6), 3–6, the Dubai Tennis Championships to Roger Federer 6–4, 3–6, 6–7(6–8), and at the Pacific Life Open to Carlos Moya 3–6, 4–6. He made a decent run at the NASDAQ–100 Open reaching the fourth round, losing to David Ferrer 7–6(9–7), 3–6, 5–7. At the Open de Tenis Comunidad Valenciana, he fell to Rafael Nadal 2–6, 1–6. He bounced back by reaching the semifinals of the Monte Carlo Masters losing to Guillermo Coria, 2–6, 5–7, and then the final of Torneo Godó upsetting Gastón Gaudio 6–4, 4–6, 6–3 and Nikolay Davydenko 7–6(7–1), 6–1, before losing to Rafael Nadal, 4–6, 4–6. This results pushed him back inside the top 50. He then reached the second round of the Estoril Open losing to Carlos Moyá 5–7, 7–6(7–4), 4–6. He ended the European clay season by reaching the third rounds of the Hamburg Masters losing to Nikolay Davydenko 6–3, 2–6, 1–6 and French Open to Marat Safin 6–7(5–7), 5–7, 6–1, 6–7(2–7).

At the grass season, he reached the quarterfinals of the Gerry Weber Open but lost to Tommy Haas 2–6, 5–7 and the fourth round of the Wimbledon Championships to Roger Federer 3–6, 4–6, 6–7(6–8). He then went back to clay and made it to back–to–back quarterfinals at the Swedish Open and ATP Vegeta Croatia Open losing to eventual champions Rafael Nadal 3–6, 3–6 and Guillermo Coria 3–6, 0–6. He didn't fare well at the North American leg, losing in the third round of Rogers Cup to Dominik Hrbatý 4–6, 2–6, second round of the Western & Southern Financial Group Masters to Andy Roddick 7–6(7–3), 6–7(5–7), 2–6, and the first round of the US Open losing to Arnaud Clément 5–7, 5–7, 1–6. He bounced back by reaching the semifinals of the China Open losing to Nadal 4–6, 4–6. At the Davis Cup Play–off against Italy, Ferrero lost his first match against Andreas Seppi 7–5, 6–3, 0–6, 3–6, 2–6, but won the decisive rubber against Daniele Bracciali 6–3, 6–0, 6–3 to put Spain back into the World Group. He then competed at the Campionati Internazionali di Sicilia but lost in the quarterfinal to Tomas Behrend 7–6(7–2), 6–7(4–7), 5–7. He reached his second final of the year at the BA–CA Tennis Trophy defeating David Nalbandian 7–6(7–5), 6–3 and Radek Štěpánek 7–6(7–3), 6–3, before losing to Ivan Ljubičić 6–2, 6–4, 7–6(9–7). However, he fell early in his last three events, at the Mutua Madrileña Masters Madrid in the first round to Max Mirnyi 5–7, 6–7(2–7), at the Davidoff Swiss Indoors in the second round to José Acasuso 3–6, 7–6(9–7), 3–6, and at the BNP Paribas Masters in the third round to Tomáš Berdych 5–7, 7–6(9–7), 4–6. He ended 2005 ranked No. 17.

2006

In 2006, he once again lost his first match at the Medibank International losing to Chris Guccione 6–4, 3–6, 5–7. At the first slam of the year, the Australian Open, he reached the third round again this time to Nicolas Kiefer 3–6, 2–6, 7–5, 2–6. He reached his first semifinal of the year at the ATP Buenos Aires losing to compatriot Carlos Moyá 6–3, 6–7(3–7), 4–6. However. he fell in the first round of the Brasil Open to Flávio Saretta 4–6, 3–6. At the first two Masters event of the year, the Pacific Life Open and NASDAQ–100 Open, losing to Paradorn Srichaphan 2–6, 2–6 in the third round and Dmitry Tursunov 3–6, 6–7(0–7) in the second round, respectively.

He started his French Open preparation at the Open de Tenis Comunidad Valenciana but fell to eventual champion Nicolás Almagro 7–6(7–3), 4–6, 4–6. At the Monte Carlo Masters, he reached the third round, but lost to friend David Ferrer 1–6, 7–6(7–5), 3–6. He reached his second quarterfinal of the year at the Torneo Godó losing once again to Nicolás Almagro 3–6, 3–6. At the next three events, he lost in the first round of Internazionali BNL d'Italia to Paul-Henri Mathieu 1–6, 3–6 and the third round of the Hamburg Masters to David Ferrer 2–6, 4–6 and of the French Open to Gastón Gaudio 5–7, 5–7, 6–7(7–9). In his Wimbledon preparation, he reached the quarterfinals of the Ordina Open losing to Florent Serra 3–6, 7–6(7–4), 3–6. At Wimbledon, despite leading 2 sets to love against Radek Štěpánek in the third round, he lost in a tight fifth set 7–5, 7–6(7–3), 4–6, 2–6, 9–11.

At the Swedish Open reached the quarterfinals, losing to Jarkko Nieminen 6–7(5–7), 2–6. He then fell early at the first round of Croatia Open Umag to Albert Portas and second round of Rogers Cup to Fernando González 2–6, 1–6. He reached his lone final of the year at the Western & Southern Financial Group Masters, Ferrero notched his first top 10 win of 2006 with a 6–2, 6–4 win over US No. 1 and No. 5 player James Blake. A few days later, Ferrero defeated No. 2 Rafael Nadal, 7–6(7–2), 7–6(7–3), and subsequently No. 7 Tommy Robredo, 6–3, 6–4, to move into the final of an ATP Masters Series event for the first time since 2003. In the final, Ferrero lost to Andy Roddick, 3–6, 4–6. Ferrero ended the year with a five match losing streak, beginning with the second round of the US Open to Marc Gicquel 5–7, 3–6, 4–6. This was followed by loses in his first matches at the PTT Thailand Open to Mischa Zverev 6–4, 2–6, 4–6, at the Open de Moselle to Julien Benneteau 4–6, 6–1, 6–7(7–9), at the BA–CA–TennisTrophy to Jürgen Melzer 7–5, 6–7(5–7), 3–6, and at the Mutua Madrileña Madrid Masters to Robin Söderling 3–6, 2–6. He ended the year ranked No. 23.

2007
In 2007, Ferrero had a bad start of the year with a first round loss at the Heineken Open to Nicolás Massú 4–6, 2–6 and a second round loss at the Australian Open to Danai Udomchoke in four sets 6–7(0–7), 5–7, 6–4, 1–6. Ferrero bounced back by reaching the final of the Brasil Open, where he lost to Guillermo Cañas, 6–7(4–7), 2–6. He was eliminated in the round robin stage of Copa Telmex and the semifinals of the Abierto Mexicano Telcel, where he lost to Carlos Moyá, 6–2, 2–6, 3–6. At the Pacific Life Open he reached the fourth round losing to Rafael Nadal 1–6, 1–6 but fell early in the Sony Ericsson Open to Guillermo Cañas in the second round 7–6(7–5), 3–6, 5–7. He also fell early Alberto Martín 4–6, 2–6 at the second round of the Open de Tenis Comunidad Valenciana. But he bounced back reaching the semifinals of the Monte Carlo Masters, losing to Roger Federer, 3–6, 4–6. However, he fell in the second rounds of Torneo Godó to Pablo Andújar 1–2 ret and Internazionali BNL d'Italia to Potito Starace 2–6, 6–3, 2–6, and the third rounds of the Hamburg Masters to Roger Federer 2–6, 3–6 and of the French Open to Mikhail Youzhny 7–6(7–3), 6–7(3–7), 2–6, 2–6.

Despite losing in the first round of the Ordina Open to Carlos Berlocq 6–2, 3–6, 2–6, he was able to reach the quarterfinals of Wimbledon for the first time, defeating No. 9 James Blake 3–6, 6–3, 6–3, 7–6(7–4) in the third round, earning his first top 10 win of the year. He lost to No. 1 Federer 6–7(2–7), 6–3, 1–6, 3–6, this marks Ferrero reaching the quarterfinals or better of each slam. He back it up with another quarterfinal at the Mercedes Cup losing to Feliciano López 4–6, 6–3, 4–6, but was upset in the first round by Andreas Seppi at the Austrian Open 6–7(3–7), 6–4, 2–6 The Spaniard's US Open campaign was a disappointment, despite making it to the third round of the Western & Southern Financial Group Masters losing to American James Blake 1–6, 4–6 after defeating No. 6 Fernando González 6–2, 7–6(9–7), he lost in the first rounds of Rogers Cup to Lleyton Hewitt 6–7(5–7), 4–6 and US Open to Feliciano López 3–6, 4–6, 4–6. He bounced back by reaching the semifinals of the BA-CA-TennisTrophy losing to Stanislas Wawrinka 5–7, 1–6 and the third round of the Mutua Madrileña Madrid Open losing to Novak Djokovic 3–6, 6–2, 4–6. His final match of the year was a first round loss to Marcos Baghdatis 4–6, 2–6 at the BNP Paribas Masters. He ended the year ranked No. 24.

2008
Ferrero started 2008 by reaching the final of the Heineken Open losing to Philipp Kohlschreiber 6–7(4–7), 5–7 and defeating David Nalbandian, 6–1, 6–2, 6–3 to advance to the fourth round of the Australian Open, where he lost to David Ferrer 5–7, 6–3, 4–6, 1–6. After the Australian Open, Ferrero suffered three consecutive losses to Nicolas Mahut 7–5, 4–6, 6–7(1–7) at the second round of the Open 13, at the ABN AMRO World Tennis Tournament to Teymuraz Gabashvili 5–7, 1–6 and to Andy Roddick at the Dubai Tennis Championships, 2–6, 4–6. He made a fourth–round appearance at the Pacific Life Open, where Nalbandian defeated him, 2–6, 2–6. At the Sony Ericsson Open, Ferrero lost to Tomáš Berdych 1–6, 3–6 in the third round. He lost to Marat Safin 3–6, 7–5, 4–6 at the Open de Tenis Comunidad Valenciana in the first round. At the Monte Carlo Masters and Internazionali BNL d'Italia, he reached the third round in both events, to Rafael Nadal 4–6, 1–6 and to Stanislas Wawrinka 4–6, 3–6. At the Internazionali BNL d'Italia, he stunned No. 2 Rafael Nadal 7–5, 6–1 in the second round ending Nadal's 17 successive match wins in Rome. He then competed in the French Openn, retiring in the first round due to a leg injury against Marcos Daniel after winning the first set, 7–6, 2–2 RET. In June he competed at Wimbledon, retiring in the second round against Mischa Zverev, 4–6, 4–6, 1–2 RET, due to a hamstring injury. He missed the next three months with a shoulder injury and returned with a quarterfinal appearance at the China Open, losing to eventual champion Andy Roddick 6–2, 3–6, 4–6. His next tournaments were at the Bank Austria–Tennis Trophy, a second–round loss to Jürgen Melzer 6–7(4–7), 3–6, and a quarterfinals appearance at the Grand Prix de Tennis de Lyon6–7(5–7), 1–6, losing to Jo-Wilfried Tsonga. He ended the year ranked No. 55, his lowest year–end ranking since 1998.

2009

Ferrero started the year with early losses in the second round of the Heineken Open to Philipp Kohlschreiber 4–6, 6–4, 6–7(5–7), and the first rounds of the Brisbane International Florent Serra 3–6, 6–7(3–7), and the Australian Open to Fabrice Santoro 3–6, 2–6, 7–6(7–5), 2–6 which made him drop out of the top 100 at No. 101 for the first time in almost 10 years. He, however, reached the quarterfinals of the Brasil Open, losing to Thomaz Bellucci, 6–7(5–7), 6–1, 3–6, and of the Copa Telmex, retiring against David Nalbandian, 3–6, 0–3 with a right leg injury. In March, Ferrero captured his first singles title since 2003 by defeating fifth–seeded Florent Serra, 6–4, 7–5, in the final of the Grand Prix Hassan II in Casablanca, Morocco. He, however, followed up with early losses in rest of the clay–court season. He lost in first round of the Barcelona Open to Igor Kunitsyn 5–7, 6–7(3–7), failed to qualify for the Internazionali BNL d'Italia, and suffered second–round losses in the Estoril Open to Nikolay Davydenko 5–7, 2–6, Madrid Open to Fernando Verdasco 3–6, 2–6, and the 2009 French Open to Philipp Kohlschreiber 4–6, 6–2, 4–6, 7–6(7–3), 3–6.

Surprisingly, Ferrero's resurgence came on the grass courts, as he reached the semifinals of the Queen's Club Championships, losing to Andy Murray, 2–6, 4–6, and the quarterfinals at Wimbledon, defeating tenth seed Fernando González in the third round, 4–6, 7–5, 6–4, 4–6, 6–4, in a match lasting about 3 hours, and seventh seed Gilles Simon in the fourth round, 7–6(7–4), 6–3, 6–2, before losing to Andy Murray, 5–7, 3–6, 2–6. These performances saw him climb from No. 90 to No. 37 in a month. He then reached the finals of the Umag Open, losing to Nikolay Davydenko, 3–6, 0–6. At the Legg Mason Tennis Classic, Ferrero advanced to the third round, before losing to Tommy Haas, 5–7, 6–2, 1–6, after beating Tommy Robredo, 6–3, 6–2.

In August he competed at the Rogers Cup, where he needed to qualify for the main draw despite his high ranking. He defeated Lleyton Hewitt in the first round, 6––1, 6–4, ending Hewitt's three–match winning streak against him. He then defeated 13th seed Gaël Monfils, 6–3, 7–6(9–7). in the pair's first meeting, before losing to Andy Murray once again, 1–6, 3–6. He lost in the first round of the Cincinnati Masters to Marin Čilić, 3–6, 4–6. At the US Open, he defeated Fabrice Santoro in the first round in Santoro's last US Open match. In the second round against Philipp Petzschner, Ferrero mounted a remarkable comeback from two sets down for the third time in his career to win 1–6, 3–6, 6–4, 6–2, 6–4. He went on to defeat No. 9 seed, when Gilles Simon retired with a right knee injury while Ferrer was leading 1–6, 6–4, 7–6(7–5), 1–0 ret, but lost in the fourth round to eventual champion Juan Martín del Potro 3–6, 3–6, 3–6. Ferrero climbed impressively into the top 20, having been ranked No. 115 just 5 months before. In his first tournament after the US Open at the China Open, he lost to Fernando Verdasco, 5–7, 4–6, in the second round, after defeating Nicolás Almagro, 7–5, 7–6(7–3). He competed in the Shanghai Masters, where he missed being seeded by one ranking position. He was crushed in the first round by 13th seed Radek Štěpánek, 6–3, 6–0, winning only 7 points in the second set. He also lost in the first round of the Stockholm Open to Marcos Baghdatis, 4–6, 2–6. He then competed in the Valencia Open but made an early exit to Pablo Cuevas in the first round in a three–set battle, 6–2, 6–7, 3–6, after serving for the set at 5–3 in the second set. He ended the year at No. 23, which was 32 spots higher than the previous year and won his first title in 6 years.

2010
Ferrero had a bad start to the 2010 season. Ferrero began the year at the Heineken Open, where he retired against Michael Lammer with an injury trailing 1–3 in the second round, after receiving a first round bye. At the Australian Open, he lost to Ivan Dodig, after being two sets to love up and seemingly cruising to victory. His mind slipped mid-match and he got crushed during the last three sets of the match, 6–2, 6–1, 4–6, 1–6, 1–6. Ferrero then competed in the Brasil Open as the No. 1 seed. He earned his first win of the season against Eduardo Schwank, 7–6, 6–3. In the following round he defeated Nicolás Massú, 6–2, 5–7, 6–2 (despite failing to serve out the match 5–4 in the second set), Carlos Berlocq, 6–3, 6–2, in the quarterfinals, and Ricardo Mello, 6–4, 6–2, in the semifinals. In the final, he crushed Łukasz Kubot, 6–1, 6–0, in 61 minutes, conceding one of his services games but in turn, breaking all of his opponent's service games. At the Copa Telmex, seeded No. 2, he won against top seed David Ferrer in the final, 5–7, 6–4, 6–3, after defeating Juan Mónaco in the semifinals, 6–2, 7–6. This was his second title in a row and extended his winning streak to 10. The tournament victory also raised his ranking to No. 16. At the Abierto Mexicano in Acapulco, he had comfortable victories over qualifier Diego Junqueira, 6–2, 6–3, and Igor Andreev, 6–4, 6–3. Carrying on his fiery form, he defeated defending champion Nicolás Almagro, 6–1, 5–7, 6–2, in the quarterfinals, not facing any break points in the first and third sets and being broken only once. He defeated Juan Mónaco in the semifinals, when the Argentinian retired with an abdominal strain after losing the first set 7–5. Ferrero faced David Ferrer in his third straight final and lost, 3–6, 6–3, 1–6. Both players admitted that Ferrero's fatigue played a major role in the final set. This ended his 14-match winning streak. Despite the loss, he rose to No. 14 in the world, the first time he was ranked that high since 11 October 2004, when he was ranked 13th.

He defeated Daniel Köllerer, 6–3, 6–0, in the second round of BNP Paribas Open, earning his first hard-court victory of the season, losing only eight points on serve. He then faced Juan Mónaco in the third round, their third meeting in a row, with Ferrero prevailing in the other two. He was upset, 6–7(2–7), 6–3, 3–6, in a match that lasted over three hours. At the Sony Ericsson Open, he made the round of 16, losing to Jo-Wilfried Tsonga, 2–6, 2–6, after defeating John Isner, 6–2, 3–6, 6–3, and Daniel Köllerer, 4–0 RET. At the Monte Carlo Masters, he defeated Marcel Granollers, 6–0, 6–3, and Benjamin Becker, 6–3, 6–4. After defeating the German, Ferrero upset Jo-Wilfried Tsonga, 6–1, 3–6, 7–5, earning his first victory over the Frenchman. He, however, lost to Rafael Nadal, 4–6, 2–6, in the quarterfinals. At the Barcelona Open, Ferrero was upset by Dutchman Thiemo de Bakker in the third round, due to not playing well in the tie-breaks, 6–7(2–7), 6–3, 6–7(4–7),. At the Rome Masters, his form worsened as he surprisingly slumped to a 0–6, 3–6 loss to qualifier Santiago Giraldo in the first round. Ferrero went into the French Open seeded 16th and tipped by some to make a good run in the tournament. He defeated Pablo Cuevas of Uruguay in the first round, 6–4, 6–3, 6–1. He then met fellow Spaniard Pere Riba in the second round, winning in four sets, 7–6(7–5), 6–7(13–15), 6–2, 6–2. However, he was upset in the third round by unseeded American Robby Ginepri. After coming back from a two-set deficit and being a break of serve up in the decider, Ferrero lost in the fifth set with a final score of 7–5, 6–3, 3–6, 2–6, 6–4. He may have been seen to have underachieved in the tournament but did improve on his previous year's performance and did therefore increase his ranking points.

At the Gerry Weber Open grass tournament his form continued to go down as he lost to lucky loser Dominik Meffert in the first round, 3–6, 5–7. His bad form continued, as he lost to Xavier Malisse in five sets in the first round of Wimbledon. He was now 9 wins–8 losses since his good run at the South American clay season. Next stop on his tour was the MercedesCup, losing to Albert Montañés for the first time in six meetings in the semifinals, 3–6, 6–7(6–8), despite having two set points in the second set tiebreak. At the German Open, Ferrero defeated Jan Hájek and Jarkko Nieminen, before being upset by Florian Mayer, 7–6(7–3), 2–6, 3–6, for the first time in five meetings. At the Umag Open, Ferrero won his third title of the year, at first struggling against Pablo Cuevas, 4–6, 6–4, 6–4, but cruising through against Alexandr Dolgopolov, Andreas Seppi, and Potito Starace in the final. He then missed the Rogers Cup and Cincinnati Masters due to a knee injury. He returned at the US Open, where he defeated Martin Kližan and Ricardo Mello in straight sets, but lost to Jürgen Melzer 5–7, 3–6, 1–6 in the third round. He missed the rest of the season due to knee and wrist injuries for which he was operated in October.

2011–2012

In 2011, Ferrero withdrew from the Heineken Open and Australian Open. As the defending champion, he withdrew from the Brasil Open and Copa Claro. He also withdrew from the Abierto Mexicano, Indian Wells, Miami Masters, and Monte Carlo Masters as the recovery from his wrist and knee surgery took longer than expected. He made his return at the Barcelona Open, where he defeated Xavier Malisse, 6–4, 6–1, Mischa Zverev, 6–4, 7–5, and Simone Vagnozzi, 7–6(7–3), 4–6, 6–4, but lost in the quarterfinals to Nicolás Almagro, 3–6, 3–6. His next tournament was the Madrid Open, where he lost in the first round to Dutchman Thiemo de Bakker, 6–2, 5–7, 4–6, after which he indicated that the end of tennis career might be near. He missed the Rome Masters, French Open, and Wimbledon due to same injury. His ranking dropped to No. 85. He returned to competition at the MercedesCup in Stuttgart. There, he defeated Bastian Knittel, Mikhail Youzhny, Marcel Granollers, Federico Delbonis and in the final countryman Pablo Andújar, 6–4, 6–0, to capture the Stuttgart title. Right after this win he went to the German Open Hamburg, where he lost in the first round to Cedrik-Marcel Stebe, 3–6, 2–6. As the defending champion, he reached the semifinals of the Croatia Open losing to eventual champion Alexandr Dolgopolov 4–6, 4–6. At the Rogers Cup, he lost to Ernests Gulbis, 6–3, 1–6, 5–7 and at the Cincinnati Masters to Feliciano López 6–4, 3–6, 4–6 both in the first round.

Ferrero's next tournament was the US Open, where he defeated Pablo Andújar in the first round, 1–6, 7–5, 5–7, 6–1, 6–3. In the second round, he defeated Frenchman Gaël Monfils in an electrifying five-set match, 7–6(7–5), 5–7, 6–7(5–7), 6–4, 6–4. His next opponent was Spain's Marcel Granollers, who retired in the second set; at the time of Granollers' retirement, Ferrero led the match 6–1, 4–3. In the fourth round, Ferrero lost to Janko Tipsarević, 5–7, 7–6(7–3), 5–7, 2–6. His next tournament was the 2011 China Open, where he lost in the quarterfinals to Jo-Wilfried Tsonga. He then played at the Shanghai Masters reaching the third round, falling to good friend David Ferrer 6–1, 5–7, 2–6 after having wasted three match points in the second set. His next tour stop was the Valencia Open, where he lost in the quarterfinals to Argentine player Juan Mónaco 3–6, 3–6. The final tournament of the year was the Paris Masters, where he lost in the first round to Frenchman Nicolas Mahut 2–6, 3–6.

Ferrero began his 2012 season with a 3–6, 2–6 loss to Frenchmen Benoît Paire in Sydney. His next tournament was the 2012 Australian Open, where he made an early exit in the first round to Serbian Viktor Troicki after a hard-fought five-set match, 6–4, 7–6(7–3), 2–6, 6–7(3–7), 2–6 in which he failed to convert a match point in the fourth set. After the match, Ferrero was fined $1,500 by the organization of the Australian Open for "audible obscenities" during the match. Ferrero represented Spain in the Davis Cup vs. Kazakhstan defeating Mikhail Kukushkin in five sets in the first tie. He then played a disappointing Golden Swing in Latin America losing three times in his opening matches. At the Brasil Open he lost to Leonardo Mayer 6–7(6–8), 2–6 at the Copa Claro he lost to Kei Nishikori 5–7, 6–3, 2–6. For last, at the Abierto Mexicano Telcel to Stanislas Wawrinka 6–2, 3–6, 4–6. He then missed 3 months due to a wrist injury. Ferrero returned at the Mutua Madrid Open losing in the first round to qualifier Igor Andreev 4–6, 6–7(4–7),. His next tournament was the Internazionali BNL d'Italia. In the first round, Ferrero beat Kevin Anderson 6–4, 7–5; recording his 2nd win in the year. In the second round, he beat Frenchman and 13th seed Gaël Monfils 7–5, 6–3. However, in the third round, he fell to Roger Federer in 3 sets: 2–6, 7–5, 1–6. After Rome, Ferrero played at Open de Nice Côte d'Azur. In the first round, he beat Dutch Robin Haase after saving a match point 4–6, 7–6(8–6), 7–6(8–6). In the second round, he fell to Brazilian qualifying Thomaz Bellucci in straight sets 4–6, 3–6. In Roland Garros, his next tournament, Juan won the first match against the French Wildcard player Jonathan Dasnières de Veigy 6–1, 6–4, 6–3. In the second round, he lost to Marin Čilić 6–7(4–7), 2–6, 3–6. After this, Ferrero did not play at any tournament, preferring to go straight to Wimbledon, where he lost in the 1st round 3–6, 3–6, 1–6 to defending champion and No. 1-ranked Novak Djokovic. He then lost in the first round of the ATP Vegeta Croatia Open Umag. Ferrero announced on 12 September 2012, that he would officially retire from professional tennis after the Valencia Open 500 in October. He stated that "The Valencia Open 500 will be my last tournament, it's the best possible stage for me to retire. Because of injuries, I was not able to play a full season and it's been a complicated year as I could see I didn't have the same ambition after 14 years on the tour. His final match was in the first round of Valencia, losing to Nicolás Almagro 5–7, 3–6.

2017
In 2017 it was announced that Ferrero would make a return to the ATP World Tour, playing in the Barcelona doubles draw alongside Pablo Carreño Busta. However, this would be his only tournament, and they would lose in the first round.

Davis Cup
Ferrero made his Davis Cup debut for Spain in the quarterfinals match-up against Russia in 2000 and won both his matches against Yevgeny Kafelnikov and Marat Safin in straight sets. He played in the semifinals, this time against the American Vince Spadea, and won in three sets, 4–6, 6–1, 6–4. His impressive Davis Cup form continued when he defeated Australians Patrick Rafter and Lleyton Hewitt in Barcelona, enabling Spain to capture the Davis Cup for the first time. In 2001, Spain fell to the Netherlands, and Ferrero lost his first match against Raemon Sluiter, losing two tie-breakers and winning one. He made up for this loss, however, when Spain competed in the qualifying rounds for the Davis Cup World Group, by defeating Oleg Ogorodov of Uzbekistan in straight sets.

Ferrero continued to be a key Davis Cup player in subsequent years. In both 2003 and 2004, Ferrero contributed to Spain's successive progress to the Davis Cup final. In 2004, Spain won the Davis Cup for the second time. In 2009, Ferrero won the fifth and decisive rubber against Andreas Beck of Germany, 6–4, 6–4, 6–4, in the quarterfinals, putting Spain through to the semifinal. In the semifinal Ferrero won the second rubber against Israel, 6–4, 6–2, 6–0, putting Spain on track to win the Davis Cup for the second consecutive year, the first nation to do so since Sweden in 1998. As Nadal returned from injury to play the final for Spain, Ferrero was not selected to Spain's final team. He attended all the live rubbers to support his teammates during the first two days of the Davis Cup final as a reserve player. He was not included in the 2009 Davis Cup presentation ceremony and celebrations on the final day.

Coaching career
In July 2017, Ferrero started working as a tennis coach of then-world No. 11 Alexander Zverev. Their work ended in February 2018 due to several differences between them.

In 2019, Ferrero started to coach 16-year-old Spaniard Carlos Alcaraz. As of 19 March 2023, their partnership has produced eight tournament wins on the ATP Tour, including a major title at the 2022 US Open and three Masters 1000 titles at Miami & Madrid in 2022 and the most recent Masters tournament victory at the ATP Indian Wells on 19 March 2023. This win returned Alcaraz to the World No. 1 ranking.

Their main training base is at Juan Carlos Ferrero Tennis Academy in Alicante, southern Spain.

Career statistics

Grand Slam tournament performance timeline

Grand Slam tournament finals: 3 (1 title, 2 runners-up)

See also

 List of ATP number 1 ranked singles players
 List of Grand Slam men's singles champions

Notes

References

Ferrero loses the last game of his career

External links

 Official site 
 
 
 

1980 births
Living people
People from Vall d'Albaida
Sportspeople from the Province of Valencia
Spanish male tennis players
Tennis players from the Valencian Community
French Open champions
Olympic tennis players of Spain
Tennis players at the 2000 Summer Olympics
Tennis players at the 2004 Summer Olympics
Grand Slam (tennis) champions in men's singles
Masters tennis players
ATP number 1 ranked singles tennis players